Joseph Shulman (September 12, 1923 – August 2, 1957) was an American jazz bassist.

Shulman's first professional experience was with Scat Davis in 1940, which he followed with a stint alongside Les Brown in 1942. He joined the military in 1943, and recorded with Django Reinhardt while a member of Glenn Miller's wartime band. 
Upon his return he played with Buddy Rich and Claude Thornhill; later he played with Miles Davis on the Birth of the Cool sessions. He worked with Peggy Lee from 1948 to 1950 and with Lester Young in 1950; he also did a recording session with Billy Strayhorn and Duke Ellington that year.

Shulman married Barbara Carroll in 1954, and the two toured together until Shulman's death from a heart attack in 1957.

References

External links

1923 births
1957 deaths
American jazz double-bassists
Male double-bassists
20th-century American musicians
20th-century double-bassists
20th-century American male musicians
American male jazz musicians